Aquadale is an unincorporated community and census-designated place in Stanly County, North Carolina, United States. Its population was 397 as of the 2010 census.

Demographics

Notes

Unincorporated communities in Stanly County, North Carolina
Census-designated places in North Carolina
Census-designated places in Stanly County, North Carolina
Unincorporated communities in North Carolina